Mount Johnson is an  mountain summit located in the Alaska Range, in Denali National Park and Preserve, in Alaska, United States. Its nearest higher peak is Mount Wake,  to the northwest. 

Despite its relatively low elevation, it is notable for its north face with over 4,000 feet of vertical sheer granite with climbing routes called the Escalator and Stairway to Heaven. The first ascent of the peak was made in 1979 by Gary Bocarde, Charlie Head, John Lee, and Jon Thomas via the south ridge. The mountain was named by famed explorer Dr. Frederick Cook who claimed the first ascent of Mount McKinley in 1906, but was later disproved.

Climate

Based on the Köppen climate classification,  Mount Johnson is located in an alpine climate zone with long, cold, snowy winters, and cool summers. Temperatures can drop below −20 °C with wind chill factors below −30 °C. The months May through June offer the most favorable weather for climbing or viewing.

See also

Mountain peaks of Alaska
Geology of Alaska

References

External links
 NOAA weather: Talkeetna
 Localized weather: Mountain Forecast
 YouTube: First ascent of Stairway to Heaven route 
 Mts Johnson and Wake: Flickr

Alaska Range
Mountains of Matanuska-Susitna Borough, Alaska
Mountains of Denali National Park and Preserve
Mountains of Alaska
North American 2000 m summits